Romani cuisine is the cuisine of the ethnic Romani people. There is no specific "Roma cuisine"; it varies and is culinarily influenced by the respective countries where they have often lived for centuries. Hence, it is influenced by European cuisine even though the Romani people originated from the Indian subcontinent. Their cookery incorporates Indian and South Asian influences, but is also very similar to Hungarian cuisine. The many cultures that the Roma contacted are reflected in their cooking, resulting in many different cuisines. Some of these cultures are Middle European, Germany, Great Britain, and Spain. The cuisine of Muslim Romani people is also influenced by Balkan cuisine and Turkish cuisine.

Overview
Romani dishes are usually made hot and spicy with the use of spices, such as paprika, garlic and bell peppers. Potatoes are also a staple in their diet. A traditional Romani dessert is pirogo, which is similar to Jewish kugel. The recipe consists of eggs, raisins, walnuts, pineapple, sugar, butter, egg noodles and cottage cheese. Another traditional dish cooked by Romani people is sarma, salmaia or sodmay, which is made from cabbage stuffed with meat and rice. Romani people consume dishes consisting of stuffed peppers, especially on holidays and special occasions. Romani people also cook pufe (made from fried flour), xaritsa (fried cornbread), bogacha (baked bread) and xaimoko (a meal consisting of rabbit meat). They serve their meals with kafa (coffee) and chao (tea) with sugar and milk or fruits such as strawberries, peach slices, apple slices, or lemon. The Roma believe some foods are auspicious and give luck (baxt). American Roma believe red pepper, black pepper, salt, vinegar, garlic, onions and a sacrificed animal such a lamb to be lucky foods. In Maribor, Slovenia, there is a Romani restaurant called Romani Kafenava. Some itinerant European Romani people cook hedgehog stew. Game animals and birds such as rabbits, hares, quails and partridge are consumed by the Roma. Snails are also consumed. Snail soup and pig stomach are Romani delicacies. Bread form an essential part of any meal. Romani food is cooked outdoors in cauldrons atop a wooden flame. Romani cuisine is also, often of necessity, inexpensive and cheap to prepare and uses portable ingredients. Thus, beef and pork are rare inclusions, while chicken and lamb and goat or wild birds and game are the preferred proteins by the Roma. Potato, peppers, cabbage and rice are often the building blocks in Romani cuisine. Rabbit stew is made with rabbit meat, innards, bacon and onions. The Roma consume roasted apples, almond cakes, clay-baked hedgehog and trout, snails in broth, and fig cakes as a snack. Baked hedgehog is flavored with garlic. The hedgehog dish is called hotchi-witchi or niglo, in Romani.  The hedgehog is wrapped in clay and placed on white-hot stones. When the roasting is done, the prickles attached to the clay are pulled off and the hedgehog dish is served wrapped in leaves. Horse meat is forbidden. Cat meat and dog meat are also forbidden. Frog meat and snake meat are considered unlucky by the Roma and are associated with the Devil. Peacock meat is forbidden. The Roma associate peacocks with the evil eye. The Roma tend to not eat at restaurants and avoid food prepared by non-Roma.

List of Romani dishes
 Almond cake
 Fig cake
 Huevos a la Flamenca (Gypsy eggs) 
 Olla Gitana (Spanish Gypsy stew)
 Gypsy toast
 Stuffed peppers
 Pufe
 Pedogo
 Xaritsa
 Xaimoko or Hymoko
 Goulash
 Cigányturo
 Bogacha
 Ciganypecsenye
 Sarma or Sodmay 
 Sax Suklo
 Rabbit stew
 Baked hedgehog
 Mamaliga
 Cabbage roll
 Saviako
 Gushvada (cheese strudel)
 Schnitzel
 Snail soup
 Shak te mas (meat and cabbage)
 Joe Grey

See also

Romani society and culture

References

External links
 How to Eat Like a Real "Gypsy"
 Inside the Culinary Traditions of the Roma people
 Introducing Roma Cuisine, The Little-Known 'Soul Food' Of Europe
 Hungary Roma restaurant eases prejudice through food
 Romani Cuisine and Cultural Persistence
 Gypsy Feast: Recipes and Culinary Traditions of the Romany People
 Food Cultures of the World Encyclopedia - Volume 2 - Page 175

European cuisine
 
Cuisine by ethnicity